Mike Feminis is an American college football coach and former player. He is the head football coach at Saint Xavier University in Chicago, a position he has held since 1999. Feminis led his 2011 Saint Xavier team to a NAIA Football National Championship.

Head coaching record

References

External links
 Saint Xavier profile

Year of birth missing (living people)
Living people
American football linebackers
Saint Xavier Cougars football coaches
St. Francis Fighting Saints football coaches
St. Francis Fighting Saints football players